Wrestling with Choukhe a type of wrestling that is played in North Khorasan Province, Iran.

Wrestling with Choukhe is one of the most famous local sports in Iran, which is known today as "Choukhe" and is popular among the Kurds of Khorasan. It has an ancient history and this native sport in many  Local ceremonies, especially weddings, have also been common.  The Kurds of Khorasan have always attached special importance to this ship and tried to train heroes in this field.  This sport was traditionally held in weddings and other celebrations, occasions and ceremonies of Nowruz in the villages.  Later it developed and became popular.

Name Origin 
The word "choukhe" is originally a Kurdish word meaning coat and means a short garment that the chukheh workers fasten with a white scarf.  Because this sport has been popular among the Khorasani Kurds for a long time, it is known as "Choukhe".

Wrestling with Choukhe in other countries 
Wrestling with Khorasan Choukhe is common in Uzbekistan, Kazakhstan, Tatarstan, etc., with the exception of Khorasan and with the titles of "Gurash", "Gulash", "Alish".  Every year, a team of North Khorasan and Khorasan Razavi wrestlers participate in international wrestling competitions on behalf of Iran.

How to run wrestling competitions with Choukhe 

The wrestling match with Choukhe was originally a competition without a specific time and weight of the athletes, and when a person was declared the winner of the field, he could hit his opponent's back or shoulders twice. However, the first regulations that have been compiled and registered for wrestling with Choukhe are related to the meeting of ten experts and selected sports veterans in Greater Khorasan, which was held from May 10 to 12, 1977 in the city of Mashhad, and these rules and regulations until  The year 2016 was implemented with amendments and changes. These rules and regulations on December 7, 2016 in Bojnourd and then on August 4, 2017 in Mashhad by the Choukhe Association with the presence of about 200 sports professors, veterans and experts in the field in the Review of Rules and Regulations of Choukhe Wrestling  Was reviewed and revised.  Choukhe rules and regulations;  Including 37 articles and 32 comments, after reviewing meetings and convening meetings of specialized working groups, spending 500 hours in the meetings of the Strategic Council of the Choukhe Keshvar Association, with the expert opinions of the Department of Traditional Sports, was implemented and approved by the Rural Sports Federation  Iran has been notified to the General Departments of Sports and Youth of the provinces of the country for implementation as follows, and the full text of the latest laws and regulations approved by Bachoukhe wrestling, which is known as Chukheh today;  For the first time published on this site is as follows:
Article 1) Terms in this sport of terms;  Choukhe, Choukhekar, clothes, Choukhe, belt Choukhe, shorts, Choukhe, mattress, Choukhe, techniques, Choukhe, technique, Choukhe, referee, Choukhe, scoreboard, Choukhe, league and Choukheh are used.
Article 2) The scope of implementation of these regulations is for holding Chukheh competitions in the city, province and country.
Article 3) Responsibility for holding competitions The responsibility for holding competitions in the geographical areas of provinces and cities is the responsibility of the heads of associations / committees of provinces / cities and holding multilateral competitions between provinces, countries and leagues is the responsibility of the Rural Sports Federation and Association.  Country.
Note 1: The person in charge of holding the competitions is obliged to observe all the rules and regulations of Choukhe.
Note 2: The notification of the officials in the multilateral competitions between the provinces and the country is issued by the Rural Sports Federation and the Choukhe Association of the country and in the intra-provincial competitions by the Choukhe Association / Committee and in the inner-city competitions by the Choukhe Association / Committee.  It becomes.
Note 3: Coaches, team leaders and team members participating in the competitions can not and should not interfere in the staff of the same period of the competition, have responsibility and even membership.
Article 4) Supervisors of competitions Supervise the proper holding of competitions and full observance of the rules and regulations of this sport in multilateral competitions between provinces, league competitions and national competitions are the responsibility of the representatives of the Rural Sports Federation / Choukhe Association and in other competitions, as the case may be.  Rural sport is the provinces and cities and the associations / committees of the cities.
Article 5) The cadres of the competitions are: - Responsible for organizing the competitions - Technical supervisor of the competitions - Responsible for the technical committee - Responsible for the executive committee - Responsible for the referee committee - Responsible for the disciplinary forces - Responsible for the competition table - Responsible for the medical team  Filming and reviewing - responsible for the scoreboard and timekeeper
Article 6) Ground or mats Choukhe competitions are held in indoor spaces and halls or in open sports spaces and on the ground or Choukhe mats in the dimensions of 10 × 10 or 12 ۲ 12 square meters (plus at least 2 meters on both sides for a safe space) and if  It is not possible to hold competitions in such spaces, competitions can be held on the ground covered with natural grass or the ground covered with a mixture of aerated sand and sawdust / soft soil and screened and lined.
Article 7) Choukhe Choukhe Work clothes must be prepared in person, underwear, Choukhe, shawl, Choukhe, and shorts, choukheh, and attend the competitions by wearing standard Choukhe clothes.
Note 1: The referee must pay full attention to the physical health and correct clothing of the wrestlers during the match, so that during the match;  The waist shawl should not be opened or torn, the fabric of the shorts should not be lowered or torn, and the folded part of the top should not be opened or torn.
Note 2: In case of rupture or effective defect of the work clothes, including: overcoat, shorts and waistband, the defect must be removed or replaced immediately (with a maximum of two minutes) with the consent and order of the referee, otherwise his opponent will win.  is.
Note 3: It is forbidden to carry a ring and metal objects of the wrestlers in the competitions.
Note 4: The work clothes must be clean, dry and odorless.
Note 5: Wearing shoes in Choukhe competitions is prohibited.
Note 6: The personal hygiene of the workers must be observed and their fingernails and toenails must be short.
A) Top cover: It is made of jajim or thick and durable fabric in blue and red color and its height is up to the back of the thigh (which is not higher than the knee) and has a short sleeve between the elbow and shoulder with an opening of at least five centimeters so that the hand  The opponent (fingers) fits snugly there, and the coat sleeve is pulled up and folded up to the arm.
B) Choukheh shorts: This part of Choukheh work clothes is made of durable, durable, black fabric with a cotton stitch that should be worn on shorts and the edge of the shorts should be folded up to the thigh so that it can be held with the opponent's fingers.
C) Undergarment (sweatshirt): Wearing white undergarments with sleeves up to the top of the elbow and without advertisements under the top, under the cover, is necessary for the undercarriage workers.
E) Waist shawls: Choukhe workers should prepare 2 blue and red shawls made of strong and compressed yarn with a width of 40 cm and a length of 2 meters that are sewn "two layers" so that they can fill the hands of the Choukhe without damage.  .
Article 8) Age groups
A) Adolescent age group: (being 14 years old to 17 years old)
B) Youth age group: (from the age of 18 to 20 years old)
C) Adult age group: from the age of 21 onwards (young people aged 18 and over are also allowed to compete in this group).
Note 1: Chokhe workers in the age group of adolescents and young people must submit a notarized consent to participate in the competition to the competition supervisor.
Note 2: Having a notarized consent is required for a worker under the age of 18 who wants to participate in the competitions of the adult age group.
Article 9) Weights 
A) Adolescents: 50-, 55-, 61-, 68-, 76-, 90-kg.
Note: Chokhe workers can participate in competitions for teenagers who are not less than 14 years old and not more than 17 years old, and their weight is not less than 45 kg and not more than 90 kg.
B) Youth: 55-, 60-, 66-, 74-, 84-, 105-kg.
Note: Choukhe Karan can participate in youth age group competitions that are not less than 17 years old and not more than 20 years old, and their weight is not less than 50 kg and not more than 105 kg.
C) Adults: -66, -74, -84, -96 and +96 kg.
Note 1: Chokhe Karani can participate in the competitions of the adult age group who are not more than 18 years old and do not weigh less than 60 kg.
Note 2: Each wrestler can participate in competitions in one weight, higher than his own weight, upon his written request.
Article 10) Advance or grace of weight In all weights of competitions of all different age groups, there is no grace and advance.
Article 11) Conditions for participation of athletes in competitions are allowed to participate in competitions, which are introduced by the association / committee of the province or city to the General Department of Sports and Youth or the Department of Sports and Youth of the city and then with a photo introduction letter from the office  Introduce the general or the Department of Sports and Youth to the head of the competition.
Note 1: Each province or city to participate in provincial and city competitions can introduce one supervisor, one coach, one driver and in each weight a maximum of two chokeh workers for each period of the competition.
Note 2: Each team during the year (from the beginning of April to the end of March of the same year) can only be introduced to different competitions from one city or province by the general departments of sports and youth of the province or the department of sports and youth of the city.
Note 3: Choukhe workers who enter into a contract as a member of a Choukhe sports team in a sports club can participate in all club competitions in the form of Choukhe league competitions.
Note 4: Having and presenting the original national card and the original valid sports insurance card
Article 12) The judges of each field / mat of the competition shall be governed by 3 judges and one time referee with the following composition:  From the judges' uniforms.
Note 1: The selection of judges for national, provincial and city competitions is the responsibility of the chairman of the referee committee related to that competition.
Note 2: The head of the competition is obliged to formally and officially invite the selected judges, at least 48 hours before the time of weightlifting.
Note 3: Determining and arranging the position of the judges of the competition as the middle referee, the head of the mat or the competition field and the competition judge is the responsibility of the chairman of the referee committee related to those competitions.
Note 4: Sensitive competitions, classification and finals of jokers will be judged by these jokers sooner.
Note 5: People who do not have a refereeing certificate can not and should not referee in any of the competitions.
Note 6: The number of judges required for each competition is determined based on the number of each mattress or field of play during a day, between 6 to 8 judges and one time attendant.
Article 13) Judges' uniforms The uniforms of the referees are the same throughout the country and include: white T-shirt with the logo of the Rural Sports Federation and the National Choukhe Association, white sneakers and blue pants with whistle and wristband in two colors, blue and red.  Each of the judges should be prepared.
Article 14) Position and Duties of the Middle Referee The Central Referee is basically stationed on the mat or the field of play and manages the competition and uses whistles and wristbands (blue and red) and always keeps his distance actively and continuously with the wrestlers.  And ensures that spectators, executives, journalists, and cameramen are in a position not to interfere with the fight.
Article 15) Status of the judges's votes
A) The head of the mattress or the field of competition must announce his vote after the vote of the middle referee and the mattress judge.
B) In case of disagreement between the referee and the judge, the final confirmer of the vote is the head of the mattress and the two side referees must announce the winner of the competition, complete the special refereeing form, sign it and submit it to the technical director of the competition.
C) The competition judge, while supervising the competition and the changes of the scoreboard, records the results on the referee sheet and announces his vote to the head of the mat when the referee gives a score to the midfielder.  E) The middle referee is coordinated with two side referees (the head of the mat and the judge) in judging and the three members of the technical committee must have complete control over the competition and during the competition must have complete control over the implementation of techniques and points exchanged.  Have.
Article 16) Scheduling of the competition supervisor;  Appoints a person who specializes in scheduling, along with two others, to scheduling the matches, so that under his direct supervision and with the cooperation of the technical supervisor of the contests, he can set the scheduling table as a single elimination, and with the help of his colleagues, record the results.  Complete the table of competitions of chokehkaran, take action from the beginning to the end of the competitions.
Article 17) Technical Committee of Competitions Supervisor of competitions;  One of the most trusted and specialized people in Choukheh sport who has championship titles and can perform the task of technical supervision of the competitions well as the head of the technical committee and two other veterans of this sport as members of the technical committee.  To perform their duties under his direct supervision.
Article 18) Duties of the Technical Committee
A) The members of the Technical Committee supervise all the technical affairs of the competitions and competitions of the team members.
B) The technical committee will be in charge of reviewing the competition video, deciding on the possible fraud of the wrestler in weightlifting, as well as on possible collusion and misconduct of the wrestler as a member of the three-member jury.
C) The technical committee can consult the supervisor of the competition in case of possible tensions and help to create calm and maintain it in the competition.
D) The selection of the most technical staff and the most ethical staff of the subscribers is the responsibility of the technical supervisor of the competition, the head of the technical committee of the competition and the head of the committee of judges of the competition.
E) The third notice will be given to Chukhekar with the approval of the technical committee.
F) If all three judges of the competition are together, the technical committee has no right to interfere in that competition.
Article 19) Review of the competition video The presence of video cameras and monitors in proportion to the number of mats is mandatory and the person in charge of reviewing the competition video can play an important role in resolving the ambiguities of the judges and resolving possible objections of coaches, wrestlers and their fans in the competition.  To play.
A) The technical supervisor of the competition, in case of objection by the coach of Chokhekar and requesting the review of the competition video together with the head of the technical committee and the head of the judging committee (as members of the three-member judging panel), reviews the disputed competition video.  The referee announces in the middle.
B) If the coach's objection is rejected, the opponent will be given a point.
Article 20) Discipline of the competition Any disorder and disturbance in the competition by any of the officials and members of the competition organizing staff, team members and spectators and other individuals, will result in decisions and suspensions by the disciplinary committee.
Article 21) Suspensions
A) Any work that disobeys the decisions of the judges for any reason and insults according to the theory of the Technical Committee and the Disciplinary Committee and the approval of the competition manager will be removed from the competition and will be suspended for 2 months to 6 months by the Disciplinary Committee.  It is considered to participate in all sports competitions.
B) Insulting the competitor and the spectators to Choukhekar, based on the opinion of the technical committee and the disciplinary committee and the approval of the competition manager, will be suspended for 2 to 6 months from participating in sports competitions.
C) If the wrestlers collude and do not fight as they should, or falsely test or lose the match without injury, which is in writing approved by the doctor or the assistant physician, it will be considered as collusion in the tournament and based on  The decision of the three-member judging panel, including: the technical supervisor of the competition as the chairman and head of the technical committee and the head of the judging committee as members of this board, are losers and deprived of the continuation of the competition.  Will be considered in sports competitions.
D) Athletes and athletes whose doping test has been or will be declared positive by the Sports Medicine Federation of the country.
E) Weightlifting fraud.
Article 22) Competition jury
A) The composition of the three members of the competition judging panel consists of three people with the following composition and its decisions are implemented with at least two votes out of three votes:
1.  The technical director of the competition as the chairman of the jury. 
2.  Responsible for the technical committee and responsible for the jury as the other two members of the board. 
B) Duties of the Arbitration Board:
1. Reviewing the video of the matches according to paragraph A of Article 19 and announcing his vote to the referee. 
2.  Investigate collusion and possible misconduct of chokehkaran and announce their vote to the competition disciplinary committee to apply legal sanctions. 
3.  Investigate possible complaints about weightlifting fraud and notify the Competition Disciplinary Committee of legal sanctions. 
4.  Choosing the most technical and most ethical worker
Article 23) Medical team or assistant physician The presence of a medical team or assistant physician along with an emergency relief bag and first aid is mandatory in all Choukhe competitions, and it is prohibited to hold competitions without the presence of a physician or assistant physician and ambulance.
Article 24) Conditions for winning with a technical blow
A) Shading the shoulders and contact of the shoulders of the working group with the ground or mattress.
B) Rotation around the axis of the shoulders on the elbow with hip contact.
C) Leaning on the elbows when the buttock is on the floor or mattress.
D) The moment the technique is executed from the foot and the opponent falls to the ground, but immediately, the technique is performed without changing the hand, which leads to a technical blow, the technical blow is accepted.
E) Three warnings.
Article 25) Conditions for winning with a technical score
A) If the chokehkar takes the opponent on his stomach by performing a fem, and so-called burying him and gaining control over him, the technical executor will gain one point.
B) If the fan is executed inside the mattress and the opponent is technically hit outside the mattress or on the ground, two points will be given to the fan performer.
C) In case of underestimation and defiance, defense and disobedience of the referee's orders, the undefeated and erring player will be warned for the first time and in case of repetition, his opponent will be given a point.
D) If the wrestler performs the technique and technique during the match after the referee's whistle, no points will be given to the fan performer and the referee must warn the wrestler who performed the technique after the referee's whistle.
E) If the team performs the technique during the match, at the same time as or before the referee's whistle, it is correct and the referee must give the skill to perform the technique.
F) If the execution time of the fan intersects with the end of the competition and leads to technical points, points will be awarded, otherwise the execution mode will not lead to points.
G) If the difference in points between the two teams reaches 6, the fight is over and the team with six more points will be declared the winner with a technical blow.
Article 26) Weightlifting time and conditions a) Weightlifting in provincial and national competitions will be done from 17:00 to 20 days before the competitions.
Note 1: In cases where, at the discretion of the competition supervisor and the head of the technical committee and the head of the competition refereeing committee, more time is needed for weightlifting;  Weighing hours can be increased up to 2 hours.
Note 2: It is forbidden to weigh people who promote culture contrary to the culture of heroism and religious and national values, or have tattoos and unusual make-up on their bodies. B) Weighing is done from people who have the original photo ID from the General Administration or the Sports and Youth Administration stamped by these departments.
Note 3: Chokhekaran lottery;  Simultaneously with weightlifting and picking up a random number by them in the presence of the majority of the heads of the teams participating in the competition.
Note 4: The results of the lottery will be signed by the majority of the supervisors of the teams participating in the lottery and a copy of it will be given to the supervisors of all teams, technical supervisor, chairman of the technical committee, chairman of the referee committee and chairman of the competition disciplinary committee.
Article 27) Start of the competition The competition will start first with the permission of the middle referee from the refereeing staff and then the whistle of the middle referee.
Article 28) Duration of the competition a) Adolescents: The duration of the adolescent competition is a time of four minutes, which in case of no result or draw, two minutes of extra time with thirty seconds of rest, is considered and with the first point won by each team  The teammate who scores the first point in these two minutes will be the winner of the match.
Note: If at the end of the competition, both opponents are equal in terms of points or do not get any points, whichever of the opponents is lighter, the winner will be announced.
A) Youth and adults: The duration of the youth and adult competition is a time of five minutes, which in case of no result or draw, two minutes of extra time with thirty seconds of rest, is considered, and with the first point scored by each of the athletes  Whoever gets the first point in these two minutes will be the winner of the match.
Note: If at the end of the competition, both opponents are equal in terms of points or do not get any points, whichever of the opponents is lighter, the winner will be announced.
Article 29) Assignment or cancellation of the competition The wrestlers have no right to give up the competition or cancel the competition in favor of the opponent and must fight. The losing team must be present on the field in full uniform to determine the winner.
Article 30) Absence from the field of competition If an athlete does not appear on the field of competition after three announcements, the loser will be declared and the disciplinary committee must consider a suspension of 2 to 6 months.
Note: If the coach does not appear on the field and does not fight without the written confirmation of the injury by the doctor or the assistant doctor, it will be considered as collusion and the disciplinary committee will consider a suspended athlete from 2 months to 6 months.
Article 31) Warning and warning cases
A) Execution of all techniques that are performed by hand from the knee down, including:  Types of knee-down injections 2.  Types of goats and getting under a bend or two bends from the knee area down.
B) Performing a thigh below the knee and placing the opponent's leg between the two thighs.
C) Putting the sole of the foot on the opponent's thigh or foot in order to stop the fight.
D) Grasping the opponent's collar crosswise and pulling the top of the choke on the opponent's head to prevent the opponent from seeing or holding both hands of the opponent's collar from the throat area.
E) Grabbing the paw and hitting the opponent's head and face.
F) Performing all techniques that are against the direction of the joints, including holding and twisting the fingers against the joint.
G) Performing unauthorized techniques and deliberately hitting, such as grabbing the opponent's neck with one or both hands.
H) Underemployment and escape of chokehkar.
Article 32) Entering and leaving the field of play
A) If the entry of rival competitors into the field of competition and their exit from the field is not done with the permission and whistle of the referee, there is a warning.
B) Holding in order to take the opponent off the field of play without actually intending to execute the technique is a warning for the first time and in case of repetition there is a warning. 
C) If the performance of the fan starts inside the field or the mat of the competition but is performed outside the field of competition, there is no warning.
D) There is no warning if the wrestlers go off the field during the match and the implementation of the technique and technique.
Article 33) Warning of underemployment and pushing When the referee wants to warn one of the employees, he points with his hand to warn of underemployment, pushing and the like.
Article 34) Lost time Lost time between matches (unacceptable stops) is not considered as part of the race time.
Article 35) The end of the match and the announcement of the result of the end of each match is determined by the middle referee with a technical kick or more points, and the middle referee raises the winner of the match and introduces him in both directions of the field.
Article 36) Injury The maximum time for treatment of the injured choreographer is announced for a maximum of two minutes, and if the doctor or the assistant doctor determines that the injured choreographer cannot or should not continue the competition, the result will be announced in favor of his opponent.
Article 37) Duties of the host of the competition, the responsibility of preparing and providing all the equipment needed for the competition and performing all support affairs, including accommodation, nutrition and transportation of the participants participating in the competition, supervisors, coaches and competition staff, from their place of residence to weightlifting areas.  Competitions and catering are the responsibility of the host.
Note: Supervising the proper performance of hosting duties, as the case may be, is the responsibility of the representative of the Rural Sports Federation, the Choukheh Association of the country, the Choukheh Association / Committee of the province and the city.

Wrestling with Choukhe Prizes 
Wrestling awards are also different from Chukheh due to its traditional and national nature.  In the term, the winners of Choukhe Square are awarded "sugar", the first person is given the first sugar and the second and third people are given according to the other sugars.  In addition to sugar, gifts such as camels, rams, carpets and sheep, home appliances, cash and coins will be the income of the champions of this competition.  Traditionally, wrestling prizes are considered as symbols of nomadic and rural life.  Sometimes tribal weaves such as carpets, rugs and kilims are used.  Of course, these awards can be different in different regions, it is important that the awards are commensurate with the dignity of the sport and support the wrestler.

Time and place of Wrestling With Choukhe 
The wrestling competitions with Khorasan wrestlers were held on the grass and soft soil on the day of Eid al-Fitr and on the 14th of Farvardin before coming to the mat on the mat.  Chuck wrestling has long been held in the heart of nature and open spaces.  If most of the ship's pits with the current chukheh that have been established for a long time, such as Pahlavan Jojo pit in Rivadeh, Sultan Zirabeh shrine pit in Imam Verdi Khan Quchan village, Rahvard village pit in Quchan, Zainal Khan pit in Esfarayen, Imam Morshed pit in Farooj and others  Pits that are located in recreational areas and the lap of nature.

The wrestling is held on soft ground or grass and with the presence of large crowds of men and women, old and young.  Today, these competitions are held in the middle of winter and in February in Maneh and Samolghan, on the 8th of Farvardin in Rivadeh, on the 12th of Farvardin every year in Shirvan, on the 13th of Farvardin in Bojnourd as a province with the presence of famous heroes of this region.  But the main and national competitions are held every year on the 14th of Farvardin in God Zainal Khan of Esfarayen city.

Wrestling with Choukhe equipment
Chukheh: Chukheh, which was the woolen garment of shepherds and farmers and in fact the old clothes of the Kurds of Khorasan. Chukhe used to be a thick and durable coat with sleeves, but today it has become a sleeveless linen vest.
 Belt : A belt or shawl that is fastened around the waist on the chukheh and holds the body firmly like a stone (Kevir) and wraps the skirt of the chokheh around it. The belt in fact Kurdish Poshti or Poshtend, which used to be worn around the waist of every Iranian three times, based on the three principles of "good thinking, good speech and good deeds" and is a relic of the Zoroastrian belt called Kushti. It was said to consist of seventy-two white threads of fleece  woven by pious women in six twelve threads. The belt is a symbol of power in the ancient myths of human civilization. Like the Shem-set that the gods and kings of ancient Egypt carried with them.
Shorts: Shorts, which are similar to wrestling shorts, except that they fold slightly upwards.
Davul and Sorna: With the sound of davul and sorna singing of Kermanj musicians, the wrestler moves around the wrestling field and warms himself up and prepares for the competition. The sound of davul and sorna, which is the rhythm of war, is also a vocal call for the news of the ship and asks people to gather and watch the ship with all their hearts and souls.
Wrestling field:  Wrestling field which is a place 10 meters by 10 meters and the ship is done there.

Choukhe is one of the handicrafts of Khorasan, especially North Khorasan 
Chinese sheep wool in North Khorasan is known among the Kurds as Pirin Brin.  The other wools that are plucked several times from the body of larger sheep are called "Harry".  Or "toon" is prepared and the threads are woven together in a uniform and cohesive manner, and a cloth made of loa or harry is made, and this cloth is called "choukh".  Athletes usually sew the choukh cloth to be turned into coats, suits, and leggings.  Was named Choukhe, and the ship became known as the Choukhe Ship.  It was in such a way that no other fabric survived in the wrestlers' fight like the Choukhe fabric.

Wrestling with Choukhe Field

Wrestling field which is a circle with a diameter of 10 meters and the ship is held there.  The ship is performed in a traditional way without stereotypes (ship on the ground and with serena and Davul).  The whole beauty of the ship is its traditional way of holding it, which can be attractive to all walks of life.  Shipwreck is always held outdoors in the heart of nature and recreational places and on soft ground or grass.  It is necessary to take this into account as much as possible now.  Shaking hands before wrestling is also one of the beauties of this sport.  Traditional and famous shipwrecks in cities such as Quchan, Esfarayen and Rivadeh such as Rahvard and Sultan Zirabeh wells and Zeinal Khan and Jejo springs are very clear examples of this.

Davul and Sorna 
By playing the Davul and Sorna by the sections, the wrestler move around the competition field, warm themselves and prepare for the competition.  The sound of Davul and Sorna is also a song for the news of the ship and asks people to gather and watch the ship with all their hearts and souls.  Kurdish music that is played with heavy and martial themes.  Two musicians, Serna and Davul, give a special atmosphere to the sport of wrestling by playing music.  It reaches its peak and increases the speed of Davul and Sorna wood.

References 

 :fa:%DA%A9%D8%B4%D8%AA%DB%8C %D8%A8%D8%A7 %DA%86%D9%88%D8%AE%D9%87

Wrestling in Iran
North Khorasan Province